El Torky or El Torkey or Torky is a surname. Notable people with the surname include:

 Heba El Torky (born 1991), Egyptian squash player
 Nouran El Torky (born 1992), Egyptian squash player
 Mohsen Torky (born 1973), Iranian football referee
 Omar El Torkey (born 2001), Egyptian squash player

Surnames of African origin